Richard A. Poirier (b. May 1, 1842) was a Canadian politician. He served in the Legislative Assembly of New Brunswick from 1900 to 1903 as an Independent member.

References 

1842 births
Year of death missing